The Chinese Basketball Association scoring leaders are the season by season individual scoring leaders of the Chinese Basketball Association (CBA). These records only record after the CBA was established in 1995.

CBA scoring leaders

See also
CBA Most Valuable Player
CBA Finals Most Valuable Player

References

External links
 CBA league official website 
 CBA federation official website 
 CBA at Asia-Basket.com 

Chinese Basketball Association awards